The South Northamptonshire by-election was held in 1962 when the incumbent Conservative MP Reginald Manningham-Buller was elevated to the House of Lords.  It was retained by the Conservative candidate, Albert Jones.

At the time of the by-election, independent candidate Buchan was serving in the British Armed Forces.  The law stated that, on standing in a Parliamentary election, he would be released from the Forces; this was, therefore, a way to receive an early honourable discharge, for the cost of a lost deposit.  The practice was banned the following year.

References

By-elections to the Parliament of the United Kingdom in Northamptonshire constituencies
1962 elections in the United Kingdom
1962 in England
1960s in Northamptonshire